Issey Morgan Nakajima-Farran  (born 16 May 1984) is a Canadian professional soccer player who plays for UE Tàrrega in the Primera Catalana.

Club career

Youth
Born to a Japanese mother and an English Zimbabwean father, Nakajima-Farran moved with his family from Canada to Tokyo when he was three. His football career began while playing for the junior youth team of Verdy Kawasaki. He later moved to England at the age of ten to play for Crystal Palace's youth team but returned to Japan when he was 16 to pursue a youth contract with Tokyo Verdy. In 2003, he began his professional football career after having signed with J2 League's Albirex Niigata.

Albirex Niigata (S)
In 2004, Nakajima-Farran was transferred to the Albirex Niigata's Singaporean satellite club in the S.League. Upon two successful seasons with Albirex Niigata Singapore FC, scoring 26 goals in 45 appearances, he was awarded the S.League Young Player of the Year in 2005, and also was invited to play a game for the U-21 side of Singapore national under-21 football team.

Vejle
In the winter transfer window of 2006, Nakajima-Farran had trials with English sides Millwall and Portsmouth, however was signed by Danish First Division team Vejle Boldklub on a 2-year deal. He helped Vejle BK win the championship and gain promotion to the top league in the Danish football system, the Superliga, by netting 7 goals in 13 games.

Nordsjælland
Following a strong performance in his first season in the top flight, he was bought by Danish Superliga side, FC Nordsjælland on a 4-year contract in June 2007. Upon his debut for his new club, he guided FCN to their first victory over Denmark's most successful club, FC København by scoring the only goal of the game in injury time. He went on to score many important goals for FCN, as well as making appearances in the qualifying campaign and the first round of the UEFA Cup 2008-09. During the summer transfer window of 2009, Nakajima-Frarran went on a trial with Eredivisie team De Graafschap, but joined Danish First Division side, AC Horsens on a 3-year deal. He helped Horsens win the championship and gain promotion to the Superliga for the 2010–11 season. In August 2011, Nakajima-Farran was released from AC Horsens after having mutually agreed with the team to terminate the remainder of the contract.

Brisbane Roar
On 30 August 2011, it was announced he had signed a one-year contract with A-League club Brisbane Roar FC. Nakajima-Farran made his debut for the Roar on 11 September 2011 in a pre-season friendly at Launceston. He scored his first goal and set up another for Brisbane in a 7–1 thrashing of Adelaide United FC in round 4. In round 8, Issey was awarded "Man of the Match" after netting two goals in a 4–0 victory over Perth Glory FC, and helping the Roar set a new Australian sports team record of 36 unbeaten games.

AEK Larnaca
During the summer transfer window of 2012, Nakajima-Farran signed a two-year deal with Cypriot First Division side, AEK Larnaca FC. Issey netted his first goal in the Cypriot league on 22 October in a 3–0 routing of Ayia Napa FC. In January 2013, Issey was loaned out to Alki Larnaca FC until the end of the 2012–13 season. During Round 26, Nakajima-Farran helped Alki Larnaca squeeze past Ethnikos Achna FC 6–5, by scoring a goal in the 54th minute, and setting up another two minutes later.

Toronto FC
On 24 January 2014, Nakajima-Farran began a trial with Canadian club Toronto FC of Major League Soccer. On 28 March 2014, Farran signed a deal with Toronto after several weeks of speculation. The following day he made his debut as a second half sub for Bradley Orr in a 3–0 away defeat to Real Salt Lake. He scored his first goal for Toronto the following week on 5 April against the Columbus Crew, the game ended in a 2–0 away victory.

Montreal Impact
On 16 May 2014, Nakajima-Farran was traded to the Montreal Impact for Collen Warner, the trade also included some allocation money. At the end of the season, he was waived by Montreal.

Suburense
Following his release from MLS, Nakajima-Farran trained and played with amateur CF Suburense in the Segona Catalana, the sixth tier of the Spanish football league system to stay fit and be close to his family.

Terengganu
Nakajima-Farran signed with Malaysia Super League club Terengganu on 1 April 2015.

After a disastrous 2016 campaign which saw Terengganu relegated to the second tier, Issey chose to stay and help the team gain promotion. He proved his words by helping them to finish 2nd in the Malaysia Premier League, ensuring their return to the Super League. On 1 November 2017, Nakajima-Farran announced that he had departed the club by mutual consent.

Pahang
Nakajima-Farran joined Pahang in April 2018.

Pacific FC
Nakajima-Farran signed with Canadian Premier League club Pacific FC ahead of their inaugural season on March 5, 2019. He scored his first goal for Pacific on July 1, off a free-kick against Cavalry FC.

CCB LFC United
Vancouver Metro Soccer League club CCB LFC United announced they had signed Nakajima-Farran on January 18, 2020.

UE Tàrrega
In March 2021, he signed in the Spanish fifth tier with UE Tàrrega.

International career
He made his debut for Canada in November 2006 for friendly match against Hungary. As of November 2013, he has earned a total of 30 caps, scoring 1 goal, represented Canada during the 2007, 2009, 2011 and 2013 editions of the CONCACAF Gold Cup and also in four 2010 FIFA World Cup qualification matches.

Career statistics

Club

A.  Includes appearances in the UEFA Cup and CONCACAF Champions League.

International

International goals

|-
| 1. || 20 June 2008 || Arnos Vale Stadium, Kingstown, St. Vincent & the Grenadines ||  || 0–1 || 0–3 || 2010 FIFA World Cup qualification
|}

Personal life
Nakajima-Farran is Japan passport holder. His parents were born in two other countries, as his father is from Zimbabwe (of English descent) and his mother is from Japan. His brother Paris, was also a professional footballer who represented Canada at U-20 level and played as a defender for clubs in Japan, Denmark, Hong Kong and Spain. Other than playing football, Nakajima-Farran is an artist.

Honours
Albirex Niigata
 J2 League: 2003

Vejle Boldklub
 Danish First Division: 2005–06

AC Horsens
 Danish First Division: 2009–10

Brisbane Roar
 A-League: 2011–12

Montreal Impact
 Canadian Championship: 2014

Individual
 Singapore Young Player of the Year: 2005
 PFAM Player of the Month: August 2015, October 2015

References

External links
 
 
 
 Official website
 
 Issey Nakajima-Farran Interview
 Who is: Issey Nakajima-Farran

1984 births
Living people
Association football forwards
Canadian soccer players
Canada men's international soccer players
Singaporean footballers
Soccer players from Calgary
Association football people from Tokyo
People educated at Yokohama International School
Canadian people of English descent
Canadian sportspeople of Japanese descent
Canadian people of Zimbabwean descent
Singaporean people of Japanese descent
Singaporean people of English descent
Singaporean people of Zimbabwean descent
Canadian expatriate soccer players
Singaporean expatriate footballers
Expatriate men's footballers in Denmark
Canadian expatriate sportspeople in Denmark
Expatriate soccer players in Australia
Canadian expatriate sportspeople in Australia
Expatriate footballers in Cyprus
Canadian expatriate sportspeople in Cyprus
Expatriate footballers in Spain
Canadian expatriate sportspeople in Spain
Albirex Niigata players
Albirex Niigata Singapore FC players
Vejle Boldklub players
FC Nordsjælland players
AC Horsens players
Brisbane Roar FC players
AEK Larnaca FC players
Alki Larnaca FC players
Toronto FC players
CF Montréal players
Terengganu FC players
Sri Pahang FC players
Pacific FC players
J2 League players
Singapore Premier League players
Danish Superliga players
A-League Men players
Cypriot First Division players
Major League Soccer players
Divisiones Regionales de Fútbol players
Malaysia Super League players
Canadian Premier League players
2007 CONCACAF Gold Cup players
2009 CONCACAF Gold Cup players
2011 CONCACAF Gold Cup players
2013 CONCACAF Gold Cup players